Post-socialist art or post-communist art is a term used in analysis of art arriving from post-socialist (post-communist) countries taken as different in their nature from Western, Postmodern art.

Crucial for such art is that:
 Because of having no market of art such art was Modernist in a sense of being non-commercial (Groys, 2004), but also;
 Having no market of art authorship was weakened authorship allowed working under pseudonyms, anonymously or even collectively (Peraica, 2006); and finally;
 Such art was necessary referring to the inner history of art, as commonly to Russian Avantgard Kazimir Malevich, El Lissitzky

Socialist art started opening to Western markets already in the eighties, introducing Slovenian collective IRWIN, Belgrade Malevich (aka Goran Djordjevic) and other artists Peter Weibel named Retro-avantgarde. In the second wave of nineties it was followed by a weakened political versions which were massively funded (Most of such art was financed by George Soros, similarly to Socialist realism which Lead thinkers as Miško Šuvaković to name such art Soros Realism.

Bibliography
 
 Boris Groys and M. Holein, Eds. (2004). Dream Factory Communism: The Visual Culture of the Stalin Era Traumfabrik Kommunismus: Die Visuelle Kultur der Stalinzeit, Schirn Kunsthalle Frankfurt Hatje Cantz.
 Erjavec, A. C. (2003). Postmodernism and the postsocialist condition : politicized art under late socialism. Berkeley, Calif. ; London, University of California Press.
 Miško Šuvaković (January 2002) Ideologija izložbe: O ideologijama Manifeste. Platforma 2 Volume,  DOI: 
 Boris Groys. (1992). The total art of Stalinism: avant-garde, aesthetic dictatorship, and beyond. 
 Svetla Kazalarska. 2009. Contemporary Art as Ars Memoriae: Curatorial Strategies for Challenging the Post-Communist Condition. In: Time, Memory, and Cultural Change, ed. S. Dempsey and D. Nichols, Vienna: IWM Junior Visiting Fellows' Conferences, Vol. 25.

Art history